Duncan Township may refer to the following places in the United States:

 Duncan Township, Mercer County, Illinois
 Duncan Township, Michigan
 Duncan Township, Sullivan County, Missouri
 Duncan Township, Tioga County, Pennsylvania

Township name disambiguation pages